This is a list of covered bridges in New York State.

The New York State Office of Parks, Recreation and Historic Preservation identifies 29 covered bridges in New York State as historic, but these are not all listed on the National Register of Historic Places.  The New York Society of Covered Bridges lists 24 historic covered bridges.

One of the NRHPs, Old Blenheim Bridge, has further been declared to be a National Historic Landmark and also has described by a Historic American Engineering Record.  It may be the longest single-span covered bridge in the United States or in the world.

24 identified by New York Society of Covered Bridges
(ordered by counties):

The following is a list of 24 of the historic  New York State covered bridges.

18 identified by Peter Folk
More modern or otherwise not-as-authentic covered bridges in New York State also exist.  Peter Folk lists the following 18 bridges:
 Waldbillig Bridge, in Albany County
 Voorheesville School Bridge, in Albany County
 Munson Bridge in Broome County
 Thomas E. Kelly Bridge in Cattaraugus County
 Erpf Bridge in Delaware County
 Fort Ticonderoga / Kissing Bridge, in Essex County
 Morehouse Bridge in Fulton County
 Old Forge Bridge in Herkimer County
 Frontenac or North Country Bridge, in Jefferson County
 Americana Village Bridge, in Madison County
 Roydhouse Bridge, in Oneida County, 
 Schoharie Bridge, in Schoharie County
 Ludlow Greens Bridge, in Suffolk County 
 Grahamsville Bridge, in Sullivan County
 Friendship Manor Bridge, in Ulster County
 Myers Bridge, in Ulster County
 Cambridge Bridge, in Washington County
 Granville Bridge, in Washington County

References

External links

 
 Dale J. Travis Covered Bridges. NYSCB Credits. Retrieved May 20, 2013.
 Covered Bridges of the Northeast USA. NYSCB Credits. Retrieved May 20, 2013.
 "Overview of the History of Covered Bridges in New York State" by Raymond Smith

Covered bridges
Covered bridges
Lists of covered bridges in the United States
Bridges